Anerley is an area of south east London, England, within the London Borough of Bromley.

History

Origin and development

Anerley has never existed as an independent entity, but rather as a general area. Prior to the enclosure in 1827 and the relocation of the Crystal Palace to Penge Place at the top of Sydenham Hill, Anerley was an unoccupied part of Penge Common, and did not develop until the 19th century. The government Act of 1827 stipulated that a 50 feet (15 metres) wide, new road, was to be set out from Elmers End Road to what is now Church Road, Upper Norwood. In 1827, a Scottish silk manufacturer named William Sanderson bought land on the former Penge Common and built the first house in the area, which he named "Anerly Lodge", a Scottish and Northern English dialect word meaning "solitary" or "only", and the road subsequently became known as Anerley Road, also giving the name to the surrounding area. Sanderson's name is the first to appear in the first rate book, dated 18 June 1827, now held in the Anerley Town Hall.

Canal and railway

The Croydon Canal was opened on 22 October 1809, and passed through Anerley. The canal was a financial failure and lasted only 27 years, being sold to the London and Croydon Railway Company for £40,250. London and Croydon Railway would use much of the former canal for the new railway line, with remnants in Betts Park in Anerley and in Dacres Wood, Sydenham. The railway deviated from the canal course entering a new cutting near what is now Anerley railway station (opened on 5 June 1839 and named initially as Annerley Bridge Station). William Sanderson made land available in return for the creation of the railway station adjacent to his house "Anerly". Isambard Kingdom Brunel built an atmospheric railway along this course in 1845, but it was short-lived.  The inability to include points on an atmospheric railway resulted in the construction of flyovers one of which runs through Anerley between Crystal Palace railway station and Sydenham railway station. A train collision occurred at Anerley on 5 October 1844 - 24 people were injured, although no fatalities occurred. The driver was found to be at fault, along with a lack of tail lights. The report stated the following: "The second tram passed the Jolly Sailor Station (now Norwood Junction) about three minutes after the first, the green light being then exhibited there as a signal to go on with caution; and on approaching the Anerley Station, the engineman of this train observed a red light on the signal post, which was the signal to stop at that station; but not seeing the red light that ought to have been exhibited in the rear of the preceding train, he considered it was gone. and just as it was slowly quitting the station he ran into it, but with diminished speed"

Anerley Gardens
   

Anerley Gardens opened in 1841, and provided entertainment to the growing 19th century leisure industry. With the new medium of rail travel and boasting its own station, Anerley become a desirable social venue, with regular dances, a boating lake, a Swiss cottage and a maze. The old Croydon Canal was also a popular destination for anglers. The pleasure gardens closed in 1868, due to competition from the nearby Crystal Palace. After the closure of the gardens, The Anerley Arms, a hotel built in the Swiss-style which had catered to visitors, was rebuilt, and this building still stands next to the station. The present day Anerley Arms is referred to in the Sherlock Holmes story The Adventure of the Norwood Builder and celebrates its connection with the story.

1860 onwards
From the 1860s the residential area developed, grand Victorian houses were built along Anerley Road, and Anerley became part of the Parish of St Paul's, forming in 1861. Anerley Vestry Hall (Anerley Town Hall) was built in 1878 for the sum of £4,341, to conduct public business for the area. It became a Town Hall in 1900 as a result of the London Government Act 1899, when Anerley became part of the Penge Urban District of Kent. The Hall was enlarged in 1911 for the sum of £3,229 and contained offices, a public hall, the council chamber, committee rooms, and a petty sessional court which opened in 1925. By the beginning of the 20th century, Anerley's heyday was over, with much of the grand Victorian houses being converted into flats, and by the middle of the century housing estates were constructed. Anerley and Penge became part of the London Borough of Bromley in 1965.  With the demise of the local government ward of Anerley, the name Anerley is mainly applied to the area in the proximity of the railway station, to the top of Anerley Hill Road and down to the Birkbeck station (not far from the traditional Kent-Surrey boundary). The postcode SE20 postcode district was officially named Anerley but covered Anerley, Penge and parts of Beckenham.

WWII
During World War II Anerley suffered extensive bomb damage, with five V1 rockets
landing; a further six landed in Crystal Palace Park and a total of 23 in the whole SE20 district. On 18 June 1944 it was reported a V1 Rocket was being chased by a Spitfire, and then shot down by AA gun fire. The shot down V1 fell upon Anerley Park near the junction of Anerley Road. Two people were killed and the damage to property were three houses destroyed with a further 20 houses severely damaged. On 11 July 1944 the third V1 Rocket strike to hit Anerley landed on Anerley Road at the Junction with Crystal Palace railway station. People had heard the rocket cut out and ran for cover, with many failing to find any, resulting in 11 deaths. The shops on Station Road were totally destroyed, and on Anerley Road 18 shops were demolished, eight shops and seven houses severely damaged and 84 houses suffered minor damage. The Paxton Arms pub was also partially destroyed and would not re-open until 1955. The last rocket would strike Anerley 24 August 1944.

Transport

Buses
Anerley is served by London buses routes N3, 75, 157, 197, 249, 354, 358 432 and bus 356. The 432 now terminates at Anerley Bus stand, behind the railway station on Anerley Station Road.

Road

Two A roads, the A213 and A214 pass through the area. During the late 1960s and 1970s the A214 was to be part of the London Ringways project. The A214 was to become Ringway 2 and it would have passed through much of Anerley, and have followed the railway line from Birkbeck station and travelled north. The construction of the A214 into the planned London Motorways network (much like the A2 or Hammersmith flyover London section today), would have seen a lot of destruction of property in Anerley and a great increase in noise pollution. After much consultation and Government dithering the various London Ringway projects were cancelled, including the A214 section.

Rail
 Anerley railway station, Southern rail services to London Bridge and East Croydon were halted in September 2022. London Overground continues to operate the East London Railway from Highbury and Islington station to West Croydon.
 Birkbeck station, operated by Southern, runs trains from London Bridge to Beckenham via Peckham Rye.

Trams
 Birkbeck station, Transport for London (TFL) operate from Birkbeck to Beckenham Junction and Croydon.
In the era of street trams, a tramway ran down Anerley Road, turning into Croydon Road.  It joined the main tram network at West Croydon. In the early days a stationary engine was needed to haul trams up the steepest part of Anerley Hill.  Later models were able to climb unassisted, but special gearing was designed exclusively for this route. The tramway was replaced by trolley buses on route 654 which operated until 1959.

TFL had proposed the extension of Tramlink services from Harrington Road tram stop to the bus station on Crystal Palace Parade via Anerley Road, with a consultation exercise on the matter finishing in December 2006. However the then Mayor of London Boris Johnson cancelled the £170 million extension in November 2008.

Notable residents
 Ira Aldridge, noted African-American Shakespearean actor, lived at 5 Hamlet Road.
 Arthur Bigsworth, aviator was born in Anerley in 1885, said to be the inspiration for W. E. Johns' fictional hero Biggles.
 James Busby, authored the Treaty of Waitangi and introduced vines to Australia, died at 5 Oak Grove Terrace after travelling back to England for an eye operation.
 Thomas Crapper, notable plumber (who did not invent the flush toilet, but promoted it), on his retirement lived at 12 Thornsett Road.
 George Daniels, noted watchmaker, lived at 21 Thornsett Road.
 Benjamin Waterhouse Hawkins, artist who designed the Crystal Palace dinosaurs, lived at 22 Belvedere Road.
 Walter de la Mare, famous poet and author of ghost stories, resided at 14 Thornsett Road from 1912 to 1925.
 Marie Stopes, Victorian-era promoter of birth control and sex education, lived at 28 Cintra Park.
 Francis Godolphin Osbourne Stuart, photographer and postcard publisher lived at Hamlet Terrace in the 1870s.

Nearest places
 Beckenham
 Penge
 South Norwood
 Sydenham
 Upper Norwood
Crystal Palace
Elmers End

References

Sources

External links
 Historical Images Of Anerley and showing Paxton Arms post V1 Rocket

Areas of London
Districts of the London Borough of Bromley